Utsulimakhi (Dargwa: Уцулимахьи) is a rural locality (a selo) in Nakhkinsky Selsoviet, Akushinsky District, Republic of Dagestan, Russia. The population was 159 as of 2010. There are 2 streets.

Geography 
Utsulimakhi is located 42 km southeast of Akusha (the district's administrative centre) by road, on the Karakotta River. Butulta is the nearest rural locality.

References 

Rural localities in Akushinsky District